Hidden Figures is a 2016 American biographical drama film directed by Theodore Melfi, and written by Melfi and Allison Schroeder, who adapted the screenplay from the non-fiction book Hidden Figures by Margot Lee Shetterly. The film's plot focuses on female African-American mathematicians at NASA, specifically Katherine Johnson (played by Taraji P. Henson), who calculated flight trajectories for Project Mercury and the 1969 Apollo 11 flight to the Moon, Dorothy Vaughan (Octavia Spencer), and engineer Mary Jackson (Janelle Monáe). Kevin Costner plays the supporting role of Al Harrison and Jim Parsons plays the role of Paul Stafford. 20th Century Fox gave the film a limited release from December 25, 2016, before a wide release on January 6, 2017.

The film gathered various awards and nominations following its release, ranging from recognition of the film itself to the cast's acting performances, Melfi and Schroeder's screenplay, and Hans Zimmer, Pharrell Williams and Benjamin Wallfisch's original score and songs. Hidden Figures received three nominations for Best Adapted Screenplay, Best Picture and Best Supporting Actress for Spencer at the 89th Academy Awards. The film earned four awards at the African-American Film Critics Association. Wynn Thomas received a nomination for Excellence in Production Design for a Period Film from the Art Directors Guild Awards. Hidden Figures was nominated for six accolades from the Black Reel Awards, while Schroeder and Melfi's screenplay received a nomination at the 70th British Academy Film Awards.

At the 22nd Critics' Choice Awards, the film gathered three nominations for Best Acting Ensemble, Best Adapted Screenplay, and Best Supporting Actress for Monáe. The actress also won the Hollywood Spotlight Award from the Hollywood Film Awards, while Thomas won the Hollywood Production Design Award. Spencer, Zimmer, Williams and Wallfisch garnered nominations for Best Supporting Actress in a Motion Picture and Best Original Score at the 74th Golden Globe Awards, respectively. The film earned 4 nominations at the 48th NAACP Image Awards, including Outstanding Motion Picture. Hidden Figures was named as one of the year's Top 10 Films by the National Board of Review, while the cast won the Best Cast accolade. The cast also won the Ensemble Performance Award at the Palm Springs International Film Festival, Outstanding Performance by a Cast in a Motion Picture at the 23rd Screen Actors Guild Awards, and Best Ensemble from the Women Film Critics Circle. Schroeder and Melfi's script garnered nominations for Best Adapted Screenplay at the USC Scripter Award and the Writers Guild of America Awards.

Awards and nominations

Notes
 Certain award groups do not simply award one winner. They recognize several different recipients and have runners-up. Since this is a specific recognition and is different from losing an award, runner-up mentions are considered wins in this award tally.

 Each date is linked to the article about the awards held that year, wherever possible.

References

External links
 

Lists of accolades by film